The Wrocław metropolitan area is a monocentric agglomeration in the south-western part of Poland, in the Lower Silesian Voivodship, consisting of the city of Wrocław (a global Gamma-level metropolis) and its satellite towns. The population living in the agglomeration is about 1 million people.

In the case of the Wrocław agglomeration, its area is not strongly urbanized in its entirety. The agglomeration is defined as an area that is economically and geographically linked to Wrocław.

Cities and towns 
Data from GUS, with population included (30.06.2020)
  Wrocław – 643,782
  Oleśnica – 37,109
  Oława – 33,172
  Jelcz-Laskowice – 15,694
  Trzebnica – 13,367
  Brzeg Dolny – 12,479
  Strzelin – 12,429 
  Wołów – 12,333
  Milicz 11,276
  Syców – 10,397
  Środa Śląska – 9,545
  Oborniki Śląskie – 9,114
  Siechnice – 8,610
  Kąty Wrocławskie – 7,023
  Sobótka – 6,968
  Twardogóra – 6,603
  Żmigród – 6,439
         Kiełczów – 6,047
  Bierutów – 4,846
         Smolec – 4,561
         Bielany Wrocławskie – 3,229

Development Agency 

In 2005, the city of Wroclaw and seven municipalities set up a company called Agencja Rozwoju Aglomeracji Wrocławskiej SA (ARAW, Wroclaw Agglomeration Development Agency). At present, its shareholders include 30 municipalities from the districts:

 Wrocław County
 Czernica
 Długołęka
 Kąty Wrocławskie
 Kobierzyce
 Siechnice
 Wrocław
 Żórawina
 Trzebnica County
 Oborniki Śląskie
 Prusice
 Trzebnica
 Wisznia Mała
 Żmigród
 Środa Śląska County
 Kostomłoty
 Malczyce
 Miękinia
 Środa Śląska
 Udanin
 Strzelin County
 Strzelin
 Oława County
 Domaniów
 Oława
 Jelcz-Laskowice
 Oleśnica County
 Dobroszyce
 Oleśnica
 Bierutów
 Twardogóra
 Milicz County
 Krośnice
 Milicz
 Wołów County
 Brzeg Dolny
 Wołów
 Świdnica County
 Świdnica

Economy 
In 2021 Wrocław's gross metropolitan product was €15.2 billion. This puts Wrocław in 165th place among cities in European Union.

Wrocław Agglomeration Association

In June 2013, Wroclaw Agglomeration Association was registered, which currently comprises 26 municipalities from the Wroclaw agglomeration area:

See also
 Metropolitan areas in Poland
 Koleje Dolnośląskie
 Silesian Metropolis

References

External links 
 Stowarzyszenie Aglomeracja Wrocławska
 Agencja Rozwoju Aglomeracji Wrocławskiej (ARAW)

Geography of Lower Silesian Voivodeship
Geography of Wrocław
Metropolitan areas of Poland